Darrusalam Great Mosque is the second largest mosque in the province of East Kalimantan after the Samarinda Islamic Center Mosque, and it is located in Pasar Pagi, Samarinda Ilir, Samarinda, which is the center of Samarinda city. The main characteristics of the mosque is that it has a large green dome and several small domes adjacent to the dome and has four minarets. The mosque is facing Mahakam River.

History 
Construction of the mosque begun in 1925, initiated by merchants of Bugis people and Banjar people. Since the construction, the building has not changed much.

Previously the mosque was named Jamik Mosque, which later underwent renovations in 1953 and 1967. The mosque was originally built on a land of 25 × 25 meters on the outskirts of Mahakam River. With increasingly rapid development of Samarinda however, the mosque was replaced by a building at Yos Sudarso street with an area of around 15 thousand square meters.

Architecture 

The building of the mosque resembles the mosques of Ottoman Empire. The characteristics are seen in the shape of domes, minarets, and a number of arches over doors and windows.

References 

Buildings and structures in East Kalimantan
Mosques completed in 1925
Mosques in Samarinda
Tourist attractions in East Kalimantan